Yokohama Air Cabin (ヨコハマ・エア・キャビン) is a gondola lift that was opened in 2021 in Yokohama, Kanagawa Prefecture, Japan. It connects to Sakuragichō Station and Yokohama Cosmo World.

Gallery

See also
Yokohama Cosmo World
Senyo Kogyo
Nippon Cable

References

External links

Minato Mirai 21
Tourist attractions in Yokohama
Aerial tramways in Japan
Gondola lifts in Japan
2021 establishments in Japan
Transport infrastructure completed in 2021